The Solihull Metropolitan Borough Council elections were held on Thursday, 5 May 1994, with one third of the council and a double vacancy in Fordbridge to be elected. The council remained under no overall control with the Conservatives seven seats short of a majority. Voter turnout was 43.6%.

Election result

|- style="background-color:#F9F9F9"
! style="background-color: " |
| Independent Ratepayers & Residents 
| align="right" | 1
| align="right" | 0
| align="right" | 0
| align="right" | 0
| align="right" | 5.5
| align="right" | 6.0
| align="right" | 4,065
| align="right" | -2.8%
|-

This result had the following consequences for the total number of seats on the council after the elections:

Ward results

|- style="background-color:#F6F6F6"
! style="background-color: " |
| colspan="2"   | Independent Ratepayers hold 
| align="right" | Swing
| align="right" | +11.5
|-

References

1994 English local elections
1994
1990s in the West Midlands (county)